Paul McDonald may refer to:
Paul McDonald (American football) (born 1958), American football player
Paul McDonald (Australian footballer) (born 1956), Australian rules footballer
Paul McDonald (Scottish footballer) (born 1968), Scottish footballer
Paul McDonald (Gaelic footballer), Gaelic football player
Paul McDonald (writer) (born 1961), English writer
Paul McDonald (musician) (born 1984), American musician and finalist in season 10 of American Idol

See also
Paul MacDonald (born 1960), New Zealand canoeist
Paul A. MacDonald (1912–2006), American politician and lawyer from Maine
Paul K. MacDonald, American political scientist